Jean-Christophe Gray  (born November 1975) is a former British civil servant who served as the Prime Minister's official spokesperson for David Cameron between 2012 and 2015. In 2021, he became the Private Secretary to William, Prince of Wales.

Career
Jean-Christophe Gray read Modern History at Oxford (1994–1997) and went on to earn an MSc in European Politics & Policy from the LSE (1997–1998).

Grey was conferred a CBE in the 2015 dissolution honours for public service.

In February 2021, Gray became the Private Secretary to then-Prince William, Duke of Cambridge.

According to The Times, "Jean-Christophe Gray has a reputation as Whitehall's most assiduous bean counter".

References 

1975 births
British civil servants
Alumni of the University of Oxford
Alumni of the London School of Economics
Living people
Commanders of the Order of the British Empire
Members of the British Royal Household